The Bosque del Apache National Wildlife Refuge  is located in southern New Mexico.  It was founded in 1939 and is administered by the U.S. Fish and Wildlife Service. It is a favorite spot to watch the migration of the sandhill cranes in the fall.  The reserve is open year-round and provides safe harbor for its varied wildlife.

Location

The name of the refuge means "woods of the Apache" in Spanish, named for the Apache tribes that once camped in the forests along the Rio Grande.

In addition to this, the refuge contains  of arid grasslands and foothills of the Chupadera and San Pascual Mountains. About  of this is designated as wilderness. A twelve-mile-long (19 km) loop road divided by a cutoff into a "Farm Loop" and "Marsh Loop" allows automobile drivers excellent views of wetland wildlife and raptors, and there are several short (1.5 to 10 miles) walking trails. The road affords good views of the fields where crops are grown for the benefit of the birds under cooperative agreements with farmers. Adjacent to the Visitor's Center, a desert plant garden is maintained.

Terrain 
About 7,000 acres (28 km2) in the center of the refuge are made up of flood-plains watered by irrigation systems connected to the Rio Grande.  These flood-plains provide an essential habitat for cottonwood and honey mesquite trees, Goodings and coyote willows, and four-wing saltbushes.  The plains are flooded periodically to give these plants the best growing conditions.

The flood plains also grow foods for the wildlife that need marshlands to grow. These plants include smartweed, millet, chufa, bulrush, and sedge. These marshlands begin dry, and are burned or turned over before they are flooded in order to produce fresh soil for the new plants.  They are then flooded to become the breeding grounds for these marsh plants.

The Bosque del Apache is also made up of several acres of dry land. One unit contains 5,440 acres (23 km2) of scrubland and desert terrain that is connected to the Chihuahuan desert.  This area is called the Chupadera Peak Wilderness Unit. In addition to desert terrain, the Chupadera Peak Wilderness Unit is characterized by tall, reddish cliffs.

Birds

There have been 374 different bird species observed in the Bosque del Apache National Wildlife Refuge since 1981 according to eBird, making it one of the most diverse areas for bird species in the United States . The wetlands attract the huge flocks of wintering cranes and geese that are the refuge's most interesting feature. Many other species—notably waterfowl, shorebirds, and birds of prey—also winter in the refuge.  Striking vagrants such as a groove-billed ani and rufous-necked wood rail have been found there. In the Chihuahuan desert terrain outside of the Rio Grande riparian zone, the refuge also hosts three federally designated Wilderness areas (Chupadera, Little San Pascual, and Indian Well).

The diversity of birds is also high in spring, particularly the last week of April and first week of May, and in fall.  In summer the area is hot but many water birds can be found, including such New Mexico rarities as the least bittern and occasionally the little blue heron.  Late November to late February is the best time for large numbers of birds, typically over 10,000 sandhill cranes and over 20,000 Ross's and snow geese. An annual 'festival of the cranes' is held the weekend before Thanksgiving as large numbers of cranes begin arriving in the refuge. Winter visitors generally plan to be in the refuge at sunrise or sunset, when the flocks of cranes and geese that roost in the refuge "commute" to or from local fields where they feed.  Although winter sunsets and especially sunrises are chilly, the daily low temperature is seldom far below freezing. Visitors typically stay in the nearby RV park or in Socorro or San Antonio.

See also
Rio Grande Trail

References
Citations

Further reading
John E. Parmeter, New Mexico Bird Finding Guide.

External links

Bosque del Apache official website
Friends of the Bosque del Apache National Wildlife Refuge
 
 
 
 

National Wildlife Refuges in New Mexico
Protected areas of Socorro County, New Mexico
Protected areas established in 1939
1939 establishments in New Mexico
Wetlands of New Mexico
Landforms of Socorro County, New Mexico
Protected areas of the Chihuahuan Desert